John Lesinski Sr. (January 3, 1885 – May 27, 1950) was a politician from the U.S. state of Michigan. He was the father of John Lesinski Jr., who succeeded him in the United States House of Representatives.

Early life
Lesinski was born in Erie, Pennsylvania on January 3, 1885, and his parents moved their family to Detroit, Michigan three months later.  He attended the school of St. Albertus Roman Catholic Church, SS. Cyril and Methodius Seminary in Orchard Lake, and Detroit Business University.

Start of career
He engaged extensively in the building and real estate business in Detroit; established lumber and supply companies in Hamtramck and Dearborn areas of Detroit.   He was president of the Polish Citizens' Committee of Detroit from 1919 to 1932, and was credited with recruiting thousands of Polish-Americans and Polish-Canadians to join the military and fight against the Axis during World War I.  In addition, he was state commissioner in charge of the sale of bonds which raised funds for rebuilding Poland when the country was re-formed following World War I, for which he was awarded the Polonia Restituta by the Polish Government.  He was a delegate to the Democratic National Conventions in 1936, 1940, and 1944.  He was also a delegate to the Democratic State conventions in 1936, 1940, and 1944.

Congress
In 1932, Lesinski was elected as a Democrat and the first person to represent Michigan's 16th congressional district to the 73rd United States Congress, and was reelected to the eight succeeding Congresses, serving in the U.S. House from March 4, 1933, until his death.

He served as chairman of the Committee on Invalid Pensions in the 74th through 79th Congresses;  of the Committee on Immigration and Naturalization in the 79th Congress, and of the Committee on Education and Labor in the 81st Congress.

Lesinski died in Dearborn, Michigan on May 27, 1950, and was interred in Mount Olivet Cemetery in Detroit.

Family
Lesinski was married three times.  His first wife, Stella died in 1919, and his second wife, Barbara, died in 1937.  His third wife Estelle Geisinger, survived him.

Lesinski was the father of nine children, seven of whom survived to adulthood—Joan, John, Maxine, Delphine, Raymond, Beverly, and Edwin.

See also
 List of United States Congress members who died in office (1950–99)

References

Sources

Books

Newspapers

External links

John Lesinski at The Political Graveyard

1885 births
1950 deaths
Detroit Business Institute alumni
SS. Cyril and Methodius Seminary alumni
Politicians from Detroit
American politicians of Polish descent
Recipients of the Order of Polonia Restituta
Democratic Party members of the United States House of Representatives from Michigan
20th-century American politicians
Politicians from Erie, Pennsylvania
Catholics from Pennsylvania
Catholics from Michigan